The women's 100 metres hurdles event at the 2000 Asian Athletics Championships was held in Jakarta, Indonesia on 28–30 August.

Medalists

Results

Heats
Wind:Heat 1: +0.3 m/s, Heat 2: -0.6 m/s

Final
Wind: +0.8 m/s

References

2000 Asian Athletics Championships
Sprint hurdles at the Asian Athletics Championships
2000 in women's athletics